Ungmennafélagið Hekla is a multi-sports club in Hella, Iceland. It fields departments in basketball, gymnastics, taekwondo and volleyball.

History
The club was founded on 26 July 1908.

Basketball

Seasons

References

External links
Official site

Basketball teams in Iceland